David Cooperrider (born July 14, 1954), is the Fairmount Minerals Chair and Professor of Social Entrepreneurship at the Weatherhead School of Management at Case Western Reserve University, and Faculty Director at the Center for Business as an Agent of World Benefit at Case.

Cooperrider also teaches at University of Pennsylvania as well as Claremont University, where he is The Peter F. Drucker Distinguished Fellow.

Cooperrider is the founder, together with Suresh Srivastva, of the theory of Appreciative Inquiry. Cooperrider's original doctoral dissertation "Appreciative Inquiry Into Organizational Life" has been cited as “the first, and as yet, the best articulation of the theory and vision of appreciative inquiry.”  It was completed and defended in 1985.

Early life and education
Cooperrider grew up in Oak Park, Illinois, and later completed his undergraduate studies at Augustana College in 1976. He earned a Master's of Science at Sir George Williams University in 1983 and his Ph.D. from Case Western Reserve University in 1985.

Appreciative Inquiry

Appreciative Inquiry was articulated first as a method for building generative theory. It was a call for "a scholarship of the positive," focusing attention on "what gives life" to human and ecological systems when they are most alive.  Appreciative Inquiry is related to theories and practices such as organization development, strengths-based management, applied positive psychology, evaluation studies, change management, coaching and counseling, corporate strategy, sustainable development, social constructionism, design thinking, biomimicry, and learning theory.

In a New York Times best-selling book, Marcus Buckingham concluded that the theory of Appreciative Inquiry was one of the three most important academic catalysts for the strengths revolution in management.  Beyond the seminal work of Cooperrider and Srivastva, the other two giant sources of the strengths revolution in management included Peter Drucker's Effective Executive and Martin Seligman's call for a Positive Psychology in 2000. Together, appreciative inquiry, Drucker's management theory, and positive psychology have created a society-wide positive-strengths movement "because it works."

What is big idea of Appreciative Inquiry? It began with the observation that ever since Taylorism, managers, researchers and consultants have seen organizations not only in machine-like terms, but in deficit-based terms as "problems to be solved" or fixed. True to Abraham Maslow's observation that "if all you have is a hammer, everything looks like a nail," those same managers and consultants became, over the years, quite good at finding, analyzing, and sometimes solving problems in organizations. So much so that organizations became problems personified—and hence a whole vocabulary of deficit-based change grew up centered on concepts like "gap analysis," "organizational diagnosis," "root causes of failure," "resistance," "unfreezing," "needs analysis," "threat analysis," and the need for high levels of dissatisfaction and urgent "burning platforms." Much like diagnostic medicine with its focus on illness, management had become locked in a problem-analytic view of the world, especially when it came to concepts and tools for managing change.

Early in the 1980s almost two decades before the positive psychology field was christened, Cooperrider began to question the deficit-based change field and the root metaphor that "human systems are problems to be solved." He observed that the pervasive problematizing perspective was constraining and limiting, just as industrial era machine metaphors were also limiting. Cooperrider and Srivastva, in their earliest work at the acclaimed the Cleveland Clinic, engaged in a radical reversal of the traditional problem-analytic approach. Influenced by the writings of Albert Schweitzer on "reverence for life," they determined that organizations are not institutional machines incessantly in need of repair and that deteriorate steadily and over time. Rather organizations are, fundamentally, living systems and centers of human relatedness, alive and embedded in amplifying networks of infinite strengths.

Instead of "problems to be solved," human systems are "mysteries to be appreciated." In a real way they are products of the miracle of human interaction and relatedness.  The more we study "what gives life" versus "what’s wrong," the more we move in the direction or become what we study. Instead of studying low morale, for example, we should study human flourishing in the workplace "because human systems move in the direction of what they study."  The simple act of observation in a human system changes the phenomenon itself. In another realm this concept has been called the Hawthorne effect. But in human systems, the result is even more powerful. Cooperrider called it "the exponential inquiry effect" to indicate how our first questions, like the early stage of a snowball, can grow into exponential tipping point movements. That's why he writes: "We live in worlds our questions create."

In a classic conversation between Cooperrider and Peter Drucker, they found something in common: a realization that strengths do more than perform, they transform. For Drucker, the development of an appreciative eye is, in essence, the first task of great leadership. "What is leadership all about?" he asked, "Leadership is about the creation of an alignment of strengths in ways that make a system’s weaknesses irrelevant." That is what appreciative inquiry does: it provides the theory and tools for (1) the elevation of systemic strengths; (2) the unification and configuration of systemic strengths; and (3) the magnification of systemic strengths outward into society, that is, the discovery and design of positive institutions that bring our highest human strengths, such as love and courage, into the world.

Today, Appreciative Inquiry's strengths-based tools and social constructionist concepts of human knowledge have been translated into many practices: the "4-D" action-research cycle of discovery, dream, design, and destiny; the Appreciative Inquiry Large Group Summit method; the art of the "unconditional positive question"; the SOAR approach to corporate strategy (versus SWOT); AI Executive Coaching; the Appreciative Inquiry massive online planning and design studio; generative metaphor intervention; the worldwide appreciative inquiry into Business as an Agent of World Benefit; and many others.

What is so noteworthy about Appreciative Inquiry as a social construction is that it was treated, right from the beginning before open source, in an open, collaborative kind of way. Cooperrider made a decision early on: no trademarks or copyrights. In fact, Cooperrider always put on the cover pages of notes and his slides, just the opposite of copyright: he said instead used "right to copy." As a result, the collective creativity of the whole AI community and field, and its impacts into organization development, positive psychology, social constructionist thought, family therapy, and strengths-based management has burgeoned. The "Appreciative Inquiry Commons" was formed as a web platform for the free and full sharing of Appreciative Inquiry resources.

David L. Cooperrider Center for Appreciative Inquiry
The David L. Cooperrider Center for Appreciative Inquiry, located in the Robert P. Stiller School of Business at Champlain College, is a comprehensive hub for connecting students to learn, apply, and amplify Appreciative Inquiry. The center was dedicated on November 8, 2014, and is the only academic center in the world focused entirely on Appreciative Inquiry. The center is run by former Cooperrider graduate student and now Academic Director of the center, Dr. Lindsey Godwin. The stated purpose of the Center is to educate leaders to be the best in the world at seeing the best for the world, in order to discover and design positive institutions – organizations and communities that elevate, magnify, and bring our highest human strengths to the practice of positive organizational development and change.

Cooperrider serves as honorary chair of the Center, acts as strategic consultant for the Robert P. Stiller School of Business at Champlain College, and participates in executive workshops at the College's Burlington, Vermont campus and in other locations.

"The Stiller School of Business at Champlain College welcomes Dr. Cooperrider ...," said Donald Laackman, president of Champlain College. "Teaming with Dr. Cooperrider, our growing network of scholars, executives and certified Appreciative Inquiry practitioners will demonstrate and teach how strengths-based organizations can and do succeed."

Impact
Cooperrider's impact on the fields of leadership, human development and management theory is significant. His work at Case Western Reserve University in the early 1980s on Appreciative Inquiry anticipated and helped bring about today's positive psychology movement, strengths-based leadership models, and positive organizational scholarship (POS).  Kim S. Cameron, Robert Quinn and Jane Dutton called Appreciative Inquiry “a pillar.” Management scholar Robert Quinn, in a 2000 book Change the World declared that “Appreciative Inquiry is revolutionizing the field of organization development.”

Nobel Laureate Kofi Annan, likewise, wrote these words after calling upon David Cooperrider as an advisor and using Appreciative Inquiry to bring over 500 CEO's into a world summit at the United Nations: “Without your innovative methodology of Appreciative Inquiry, it would have been very difficult, perhaps even impossible, to constructively engage so many leaders of business, civil society, and government.” A UN Leaders report for the Global Compact's 8,000 corporations said “Appreciative Inquiry is the best large group method in the world today.” 

All of this also affected the experiential learning field, including his most recent work focused on "Flourishing Organizations." In 2000, for his contribution to organizational learning and development, Cooperrider was given the "Distinguished Contribution Award to Workplace Performance and Learning" by the American Society for Training and Development.

Then, in 2004, for his world inquiry with Ron Fry into Business as an Agent of World Benefit, the Aspen Institute gave him the “Faculty Pioneer Award for Impact” in the domain of sustainable development. That work, including his book with Jane Dutton on The Organization Dimensions of Global Change: No Limits to Cooperation, has given birth to two major institutions and endowments: The Fowler Center for Sustainable Value and the ongoing global forum series hosted by Case Western Reserve University in partnership with the United Nations Global Compact and Academy of Management titled “The Global Forum for Business as an Agent of World Benefit.”

According to Ode Magazine,  "In the field of Corporate Social Responsibility and Sustainability, Cooperrider leads the movement towards a more sustainable future, ...".

Bibliography
Cooperrider has published numerous books and authored more than 60 articles and book chapters. His book with Diana Whitney Appreciative Inquiry: A Positive Revolution in Change has been a best-seller with multiple printings. His original article on Appreciative Inquiry (with Suresh Srivastva) in 1987, which appeared in the series Research in Organizational Change and Development, Vol. 1, has become an important source for its field since publication.

Cooperrider's writings include:

Books
 1985, Appreciative Inquiry: A Methodology for Advancing Social Innovation. Phd Dissertation by David Cooperrider.
 1990, Appreciative management and leadership: the power of positive thought in organizations coauthored with Suresh Srivastva.
 1998, Organizational wisdom and executive courage coauthored with Suresh Srivastva.
 1999, Appreciative Inquiry: Rethinking human organization toward a positive theory of change coauthored with Peter Sorenson, et al.
 1999, The organizational dimensions of global change: No limits to cooperation coauthored with Jane Dutton.
 2001, The Appreciative Organization coauthored with Harlene Anderson, et al.
 2001, Encyclopedia of positive questions coauthored with Diana Whitney.
 2004, Appreciative Inquiry handbook: For leaders of change coauthored with Diana Whitney and Jackie Stavros.
 2004, Discourse and change in organizations.  Volume one in Advances in Appreciative Inquiry coauthored with Michel Avital.
 2005, Appreciative Inquiry: Foundations in positive organization development, coauthored with Peter Sorenson et al.
 2005, Appreciative Inquiry: A positive revolution in change with Diana Whitney.
 2007, Handbook of transformative cooperation coauthored with Sandy Piderit and Ronald Fry.
 2007, Designing information and organizations with a positive lens  (Volume Two in Advances in Appreciative Inquiry) coauthored with Michel Avital and Richard Boland.
 2008, Essentials of Appreciative Inquiry coauthored with Diana Whitney and Jackie Stavros.
 2010, Appreciative Inquiry and Sustainable Design (Volume Three in Advances in Appreciative Inquiry) coauthored with Tojo Thachenkery and Michel Avital.
 2010, Developing Tomorrow's Leaders to Enact Corporate Citizenship: The Call and Opportunity for Business Schools coauthored with Ronald Fry.
 2012, Advances in the AI Summit: Explorations into the Magic of Macro and Crowdsourcing coauthored with Lindsey Godwin et al.
 2013, Appreciative Inquiry: An innovative approach to personal and organizational transformation with Miriam Subriana.

Personal life
Cooperrider lives in Chagrin Falls, Ohio with his wife Nancy, an artist. His son Matt is a wind energy consultant, his daughter Hannah is an interior designer,  and his eldest son Daniel is a minister at a United Church of Christ congregation in New England.

References

External links
 Presentation from 2008 International Alliance for Learning Conference

Case Western Reserve University faculty
Living people
1954 births
Augustana College (Illinois) alumni
Sir George Williams University alumni
American business theorists